The Japan-EU Economic Partnership Agreement (EPA, also called Japan-EU free trade agreement, JEFTA) is in force since 1 February 2019 after having been negotiated from 2013 to 2017. The EPA is the largest bilateral free trade agreement of the EU, covering 30 percent of world' gross domestic product (GDP) and 40 percent of global trade. Japan's prime minister at the time, Shinzō Abe, said the deal signified the creation of "the birth of the world's largest, free, industrialised economic zone".

See also 
 UK–Japan Comprehensive Economic Partnership Agreement

Links 

 Full text of the EPA in English, French and German (EUR-Lex)
 Full text in Japanese and English (Ministry of Foreign Affairs Japan)

References 

Economy of Japan
Foreign relations of Japan
Foreign relations of the European Union
Free trade agreements